Sergei Yuryevich Zhuravlyov (born 10 October 1976) is a former Russian football player.

References

1976 births
Living people
Russian footballers
FC Tyumen players
Russian Premier League players

Association football defenders